Sir Thomas Honywood (15 January 1586 –  26 May 1666) was an English soldier during the English Civil War and later a Member of Parliament and also called to Parliament as Thomas, Lord Honywood. He was seated at Marks Hall, Essex.

Life
The eldest son of Robert Honywood and grandson of Mary Honywood, Honywood was born at Betchworth Castle, Surrey. He was the half-brother of Sir Robert Honywood. He was the head of a prominent Essex family and knighted on 22 November 1632. 

On the outbreak of the Civil War he declared for the parliamentary side, and was one of the Committee for Essex in 1648. In the same year, under the command of Thomas Fairfax, he led the Essex forces at the Siege of Colchester. In 1649, he was one of those named in the commission to try the King, but did not serve on the court. He also led a regiment at the Battle of Worcester in 1651. He was created D.C.L. at Oxford University on 9 September 1651.

In Parliament
Sir Thomas was elected to Parliament as member for Essex in the First and Second Parliaments of the Protectorate, and in 1658 was raised to Cromwell's new Upper House. However, he was distrusted by the hardline Puritans and considered "rather soft in his spirit". He retired from public life after the Restoration.

Private life
He married Hester Manning (d.1681) daughter of London merchant John La Motte, on 13 May 1634 at All Hallows, London Wall, London and the widow of London merchant John Manning (d.1634). He was succeeded by their son John Lamotte Honywood; their daughter Elizabeth Honywood married Sir John Cotton. He died at his son-in-law's home, Cotton House, in Westminster.

References

Sources
 Concise Dictionary of National Biography (1930)
 R. C. Latham & W. Matthews, The Diary of Samuel Pepys, Volume X - Companion (London: HarperCollins, 1995)
 Mark Noble, Memoirs of several persons and families... allied to or descended from... the Protectorate-House of Cromwell (Birmingham: Pearson & Rollason, 1784) 

1586 births
1666 deaths
Military personnel from Surrey
Knights Bachelor
Members of Cromwell's Other House
Members of the Inner Temple
People from Braintree District
Alumni of the University of Oxford
Roundheads
English MPs 1654–1655
English MPs 1656–1658
Parliamentarian military personnel of the English Civil War